The Joke Thief is a 2018 Canadian drama film written by, produced by, directed by and starring Frank D'Angelo.

Plot

Cast
Frank D'Angelo as Simon McCabe
Sugith Varughese as Jerry the Uber Driver
Daniel Baldwin as Freddy C.
John Ashton as Joseph Rogers
Alyson Court as Margaret Fellows
Art Hindle as Brian McCabe

Reception
Linda Howard, writing for The Herald, said, "The Joke Thief is littered with stand-out scenes and one-liners that pull you in right from the opening scene and sultry soundtrack, which coincidentally, stars three generations of the D'Angelo family."

References

External links
 

2018 films
Canadian drama films
English-language Canadian films
Films directed by Frank D'Angelo
2010s English-language films
2010s Canadian films